Chaupal is a town and nagar panchayat (city council) in the Shimla district of the Indian state of Himachal Pradesh.

Geography 

Chaupal is a Sub Division (administrative division) of Shimla District. It is surrounded by hills and forests of Deodars. It is also known for its densely covered areas of Himalayan Cedar trees in the town.
This is one of the richest forest areas of Himachal. Devdar, kail, fir spruce and ban trees are in plenty in forests of Chaupal. Best quality Devdar trees in Asia are in Chaupal, the timber extracted from these majestic trees is very durable, have high strength, resistant to pests to some extent due to the presence of the extractives like cedar oil, in the wood. The forest region of Chaupal is among the oldest Forest Department Divisions in the state;  it is currently headed by Divisional Forest Officer Ankit Kumar Singh.

Demographics 

According to the 2011 Indian census, Chaupal had a population of 7886 people. Of the population, 58% are male, and 42% are female. Chaupal has a literacy rate of 89.65%.The native language here is Pahari but Hindi and English are also spoken.

Economy 

The region has high quality apples, which are exported internationally. Apple-growing areas in Chaupal include Jaigarh, Tarapur (Nar), Chambi, Nanhar - Jakholi, Tharoch, Poran, Pauria, Bijmal, Peontra Valley, Bamta, Rinjat, Khaddar, Matal, Chanju (Chopal), Kashah, Rushlah, Satota (Halau, Shalan) Dewat, Kakhrona, Shilikyan, Shantha, Sunarli, Maraog, Bigraoli, Jhina, Phaluna and Sarain.

Climate 

Chaupal has a cool and moderate climate. Between December and March, the town gets heavy snow and the temperature can hover around freezing point. During the summer, the climate is warmer with temperatures around thirty degrees Celsius.

 Temp in Winter: to 
 Temp in Summer: to

References 

Cities and towns in Shimla district
Tehsils of Himachal Pradesh